Sir Peter Colleton, 2nd Baronet, FRS (17 September 1635 – 24 March 1694) was an English baronet of the Colleton Baronets and an MP.

He was the eldest son of Sir John Colleton, 1st Baronet, of Exeter, Devon, whom he succeeded in 1667.

He became a merchant and was a Member of the council of the Barbados in 1664–1684. He was a member of the Royal Adventurers into Africa in 1667–1672 and a member of the Hudson’s Bay Company from 1670 to his death.

He was elected a Fellow of the Royal Society in 1677.

He was MP for Bossiney (UK Parliament constituency) in 1681–1685 and 1689–1694.

References

1635 births
1694 deaths
Businesspeople from Exeter
Baronets in the Baronetage of England
Members of the pre-1707 English Parliament for constituencies in Cornwall
English MPs 1681
English MPs 1689–1690
English MPs 1690–1695
Place of birth missing
Place of death missing
Fellows of the Royal Society
Lords Proprietors of Carolina
British slave owners
Politicians from Exeter